Field hockey competitions were competed at the Universiade in 1991 and 2013 as optional sport.

Events

Medal winners

Men

Women

Medal table
Last updated after the 2013 Summer Universiade.

References 
 International Field Hockey Federation

Sports at the Summer Universiade
Universiade